The 1974 season of the Lion Shield was the fourth recorded season of top flight association football competition in Tonga. Kolofo'ou No.1
won the championship, their fourth successive title.

References

Tonga Major League seasons
Tonga
Football